Olga Govortsova and Klaudia Jans-Ignacik were the defending champions but decided not to participate.
Kimiko Date-Krumm and Chanelle Scheepers won the title, defeating Cara Black and Marina Erakovic, 6–4, 3–6, [14–12].

Seeds

Draw

Draw

References
 Main Draw

Internationaux de Strasbourgandnbsp;- Doubles
2013 Doubles
2013 in French tennis